Bunjwah (also known as Bonjwah) is a region and tehsil located in the Kishtwar district of Jammu and Kashmir, India. It comprises nine panchayat and two nayabats; it became a tehsil in 2014.

Demographics
Bunjwah is an economically underdeveloped area consisting of 2,798 households and a total population of 15,899—8,205 males and 7,694 females.

Location
It borders Saroor, Nagseni Padhyarna, the Padder of Kishtwar district, Chilly, Bhalessa, Bhatyas, and Challer of Doda district, while one of its boundaries runs along Himachal Pradesh's road towards Chamba located in Bunjwah tehsil.

Route
The route to Bunjwah from its nearest airport in Jammu goes through Batote via the National Highway 144, the Chenani-Nashri Tunnel, and the National Highway 244. To reach Bunjwah, it is necessary to leave the National Highway by a link road towards Thathri-Donadi where a route forks off to Bunjwah.

Economy 
The region remains neglected by the state government and the district administration. The “Bunjwah” area further suffers from underdevelopment and the effects of being denied basic rights and status in the Indian constitution. Most families lack the basic skills and training necessary to advance their agricultural development.

Demand for sub division status
As of 2020, demand for separate Bunjwah sub division status increased with the arguments of negligence by the present district administration.

Education 
While over 50 primary schools were built in the district, there is only one secondary school in the region, and the education is not affordable for many residents.

References

Chenab Valley
Villages in Kishtwar district
Kishtwar district